The No. 5 Bayonet was the bayonet used with the No 5 Lee-Enfield  which is nicknamed "Jungle carbine ". The bayonet was a blade which marked a return of the British Army to using blade type bayonets like the Pattern 1907 bayonet instead of socket bayonets such as the No. 4 Bayonets used on the No. 4 Lee-Enfield.

Production 
There were was only 1 variant of the No 5 bayonet produced which is the No 5 mk I bayonet. During World War II Wilkinson Sword in London  produced by far the most  No 5 mk I bayonets with them producing close to 190,000 bayonets.  Other producers were a company called Radcliffe who made 75,000,Viners of Sheffield who made 42,000 and Elkington & Co who produced close to 10,000. Post war manufacturing  was done by the Royal Ordnance Factory in Poole. It is unknown how many they produced.

References

Bayonets
World War II infantry weapons of the United Kingdom